Asbjørn Skarstein (7 March 1922 – 22 October 1999) was a Norwegian civil servant and diplomat.

He was born in Kristiania, and held the siv.øk. degree. He was hired in the Ministry of Foreign Affairs as an assistant secretary in 1956. He served as a councillor at the Norwegian embassies in Switzerland from 1960 and Belgium from 1962. In 1965 he returned to Norway; being a sub-director from 1965 to 1967 and deputy under-secretary of state from 1967 to 1975, both in the Ministry of Foreign Affairs. He was then the permanent under-secretary of state in the Norwegian Ministry of Trade and Shipping, the highest-ranking bureaucratic position, from 1975 to 1981. He then served as Norway's ambassador to Italy from 1981 to 1984. He also doubled as the ambassador to Malta. In 1985 Georg Kristiansen left as ambassador of France. Skarstein took over and served until 1988.

References

1922 births
1999 deaths
Diplomats from Oslo
Ambassadors of Norway to Italy
Ambassadors of Norway to Malta
Ambassadors of Norway to France
Norwegian expatriates in Switzerland
Norwegian expatriates in Belgium